Edward Scaife BSC (23 May 1912 – November 1994) was an English cinematographer, who worked five times with the director John Huston.

Sometimes credited as Ted Scaife, he worked originally in the sound department of a London film company. From 1940 onwards, he was a member of the camera crew in productions such as Michael Powell's Black Narcissus (1947) and Huston's  African Queen. From 1951 he was first employed as a chief camera man, and photographed films of all genres, including Night of the Demon (1957), 633 Squadron (1964), Khartoum (1966), and The Dirty Dozen (1967), before retiring from the industry in 1979.

Selected filmography
1947: Black Narcissus (Camera operator)
1949: The Third Man (Camera operator)
1951: Pandora and the Flying Dutchman (2nd Unit Photographer)
1951: Outcast of the Islands 
1951: The African Queen (Second Unit photography)
1953  The Intruder 
1954: An Inspector Calls
1955: A Kid for Two Farthings
1956: Smiley1957: Night of the Demon1959: The House of the Seven Hawks1959: Tarzan's Greatest Adventure                                                      
1960: Carry on Constable1962: The Dock Brief1962: The List of Adrian Messenger (European Unit Director of Photography)
1963: Tarzan's Three Challenges1964: 633 Squadron1965: Young Cassidy1966: Khartoum1967: The Dirty Dozen1969: A Walk with Love and Death1969: Sinful Davey1970: The Kremlin Letter1971: Catlow1978: The Water Babies (Scaife won Best Cinematography award at Fantafestival'', 1981)

References

External links
 

1912 births
1994 deaths
English cinematographers
Film people from London